The Cunene barb or topstripe barb (Enteromius dorsolineatus) is a species of ray-finned fish in the genus Enteromius, it occurs only in Angola where it is found in the Catumbela, Balombo, and Kunene river systems.

References

 

Endemic fauna of Angola
Enteromius
Fish described in 1936
Taxa named by Ethelwynn Trewavas
Cyprinid fish of Africa